The EMD Model 40 was a two-axle diesel-electric locomotive built by Electro-Motive Corporation (EMC), and its corporate successor, General Motors' Electro-Motive Division (EMD) between August 1940 and April 1943. Nicknamed "critters", eleven examples of this locomotive were built. Powered by twin General Motors Detroit Diesel 6-71 diesel engines, which produce a combined . It's drivetrain is unusual because the two diesel engines are used to drive the electric DC generator from both sides, one with clockwise rotation and the other with counter-clockwise rotation.

Original buyers for the Model 40 included the Electro-Motive Corporation/Electro-Motive Diesel Plant, 1 unit (used as the #2 plant switcher), Defense Plant Corporation, 4 units, the United States Army, 3 units, the United States Navy, 2 units, and the General Motors Cleveland Diesel Division, 1 unit.

In total EMC/EMD manufactured eleven Model 40s during the period April 1940 - April 1943.

Roster of locomotives 
 s/n 1134: Built as EMC 1134 (demonstrator), to McKinnon Industries (GM Canada), to Andrew Merrilees, later sold to Devco Railway #20, retired to Museum of Industry, Stellarton, Nova Scotia (currently stored out of public display).
 s/n 1308: Built for Defence Plant Corp. (De Moines, IA), to Old Ben Coal (on site before 1956), purchased by Precision Engineering for parts (around 1968), scrapped.
 s/n 1309: Built for US Rubber, to Penn Dixie Cement, retired to Lake Superior Railroad Museum at Duluth, Minnesota.
 s/n 1834: Built as USAX 7403, to DPC #1 Cushing Stone Company of Amsterdam, New York (still on property,operational into the 1990s, out of use by ????)
 s/n 1835: Built as DPC #2, to American Steel Foundry 51, to Lipsett Steel Foundries, to Calumet Steel, donated to Hoosier Valley Railroad Museum in North Judson, Indiana
 s/n 2284: Built as USAX 7952, to Acme Newport Steel, Newport, KY as NPTX #1. Owned and restored by Professional Locomotive Services in East Chicago, Indiana
 s/n 2285: Built as USAX 7953, to Gulf South Terminal Warehousing (somewhere between 1946-49), to American Creosote Works (acquired 1950-56), resold to Coastal Sand & Gravel (Lacombe, LA); operation abandoned by the 1980s, hulk of engine still on site.
 s/n 2286 Built as USAX 7954, to Sanderson & Porter Construction (contractors for West Penn Power), moved to West Penn Power - Mitchell Plant, transferred to West Penn Springdale Station, to Hagerstown Roundhouse Museum, leased to Walkersville Southern Railroad, Walkersville, Maryland.
 s/n 2287 Built as USN #4, used during WWII by the Naval Ordinance Plant in York, PA. Remained on site, transferred to the American Machine and Foundry Company (AMF) and subsequently Harley-Davidson.  Now on display at the York County History Center's Agricultural and Industrial Museum in York, Pennsylvania.
 s/n 2288 Built as USN #56-00323, to Douglas Aircraft Industrial Reserve Plant (later McDonnell Douglas), retired to Travel Town Museum, Los Angeles, California.
 s/n 2289 Built as GM Cleveland (unknown number), transferred to GM-EMD South Chicago Plant 2, out of use by mid 1970s, scrapped.

Gallery

References 

 Dover, D. (1969) “EMD Model 40 Roster,” Extra 2200 South, February-March, pp. 20–21.

External Links
Trains Magazine feature

Photo feature by Craig Rutherford/TheDieselShop

Model 40
United States Army locomotives
B locomotives
Diesel-electric locomotives of the United States
Railway locomotives introduced in 1940
Standard gauge railway locomotives

Shunting locomotives